Tyson Patterson (born September 17, 1978) is an American former professional basketball player. He is 5'9", weighs 165 pounds and played the point guard position. Patterson played college basketball at Appalachian State University (ASU) between 1996–97 and 1999–2000. Through the 2011–12 season he still holds school records for assists in a game (14), season (218), and career (638), steals in a season (87), and field goal percentage in a game (100%, 12-for-12 shooting).

Playing career

College
After graduating from East Forsyth High School in Winston-Salem, North Carolina, Patterson enrolled at ASU to play for the Mountaineers. In his first season, ASU finished with a 14–14 overall record and a third-place finish in the Southern Conference's (SoCon) North Division. During his final three seasons, however, Patterson was the leader in what ASU calls "perhaps the finest four-year span in [their] hardwood history." Between 1998 and 2000, the Mountaineers rattled off three consecutive North Division titles, made it to the SoCon tournament championship game every season (winning it in 2000, thereby earning their school's second-ever NCAA tournament bid), and compiled a three-year win–loss record of 65–25 (39–8 SoCon). Patterson led ASU in both assists and steals in each of his final three years, was a three-time All-SoCon Tournament Team selection, a two-time First Team All-SoCon (regular season) selection, and as a senior was named the SoCon Tournament MVP as well as the conference player of the year. In 2009, Patterson was inducted into the Appalachian State Hall of Fame.

Professional
As an undersized guard coming from a mid-major basketball program, no National Basketball Association (NBA) teams selected him in the 2000 NBA Draft. Patterson carved out a professional career and professional career that took him to leagues all over the world as well as in the United States. Other than the United States, he has played for clubs in Belgium, Finland, France, Iceland, Mexico, Switzerland and Venezuela. In 2006-2007 he played with KR in the Icelandic Úrvalsdeild and led the league in assists per game (8.0). He helped KR win the Icelandic national championship that spring and was named the Playoffs MVP. Some of his other highlights include leading Finland's Korisliiga in assists per game (5.2) in 2007–08, winning France's LNB Pro B championship in 2004–05, and also being named LNB Pro B's "Foreign Players' MVP" that same season.

References

External links
NBA Development League stats
Icelandic Úrvalsdeild stats

1978 births
Living people
American expatriate basketball people in Belgium
American expatriate basketball people in Finland
American expatriate basketball people in France
American expatriate basketball people in Iceland
American expatriate basketball people in Mexico
American expatriate basketball people in Switzerland
American expatriate basketball people in Venezuela
American men's basketball players
Appalachian State Mountaineers men's basketball players
Asheville Altitude players
Basketball players from Winston-Salem, North Carolina
Grindavík men's basketball players
Guaros de Lara (basketball) players
KR men's basketball players
Liège Basket players
Point guards
Reims Champagne Basket players
Torpan Pojat players
Úrvalsdeild karla (basketball) players
United States Basketball League players